Ajab Gazabb Love is a 2012 Indian Hindi-language romantic comedy film directed by Sanjay Gadhvi and produced by Vashu Bhagnani. The film stars Arjun Rampal in a double role, along with Jackky Bhagnani opposite Nidhi Subbaiah in lead roles and Darshan Jariwala and Kirron Kher in supporting roles, whilst Arshad Warsi appears in a cameo role. The screenplay and dialogues were written by Mayur Puri. The theatrical trailer of the film revealed on 13 August 2012, whilst the film released worldwide on 26 October 2012, and received mostly negative response. The storyline is remade from the Telugu film Seema Tapakai.

Plot
The story revolves around Rajveer, a hard-working, rich youngster who is the heir of his father, Yashvardhan Grewal, and his company, Grewal Motors Co. When Rajveer falls in love with Madhuri, he realises that she hates all rich people, and has much sympathy for poor families. Therefore, Rajveer starts a drama, in which he pretends to be poor along with his family to gain Madhuri's love. However, when Madhuri's elder brother Karan Singh Chauhan, arrives to meet Rajveer's family, he begins to suspect him, and as the truth slowly foils out, mayhem strikes!

Cast
 Arjun Rampal as Karan Singh Chauhan / Arjun Singh Chauhan (dual role)
 Jackky Bhagnani as Rajveer Grewal
 Nidhi Subbaiah as Madhuri “Maddy” Singh Chauhan 
 Darshan Jariwala as Yashvardhan Grewal
 Kirron Kher as Rashmi Grewal
 Arshad Warsi as Subramanium Seth (Subhu)
 Anuja Sachdeva as Switty Grewal
 Prageet Pandit as Adarsh Grewal
 Mayur Puri as T2
 Mokshad Dodwani

Production
The film is a remake of Seema Tapakai, a Telugu film starring Allari Naresh and Shamna Kasim.

Soundtrack

The songs were composed by Sajid–Wajid, with lyrics penned by Priya Panchal and Kausar Munir. The songs were sung by Mika Singh, Mohit Chauhan and Antara Mitra amongst others. Punjabi track "Nachde Punjabi" by Dalvinder Singh and Tarli Digital, which was released in the early 20s, was remade for the film by Sachin–Jigar.

The film score is composed by Sandeep Shirodkar.

Critical reception

Ajab Gazabb Love received average to negative reviews from film critics upon its release. Madhureeta Mukherjee of Times of India gave it 2.5/5 stars. "This film is all about a bunch of people going bananas, yet, it doesn't leave you in splits. But if you care for a few giggles, go watch it.!!!" said ToI. Rediff Movies said "Ajab Gazabb Love is reminiscent of the bad films of the bad 1990s" and gave it 2 stars. Nayandeep of Koimoi gave it 2 stars "There is nothing 'ajab' or 'gazabb' about this extremely ordinary rom-com." wrote Nayandeep. Social Movie Rating site MOZVO gave it a rating of 2.3 putting it in 'Below Average' category. Taran Adarsh of Bollywood Hungama gave it 3 stars. Kanika Sikka of DNA gave it 1.5 stars.

Box office
Ajab Gazabb Love had collected  in its first week.

References

External links
 
 

2012 films
2012 romantic comedy films
Indian romantic comedy films
Films directed by Sanjay Gadhvi
Hindi remakes of Telugu films
Hindi-language comedy films